Skudzawy  is a village in the administrative district of Gmina Skrwilno, within Rypin County, Kuyavian-Pomeranian Voivodeship, in north-central Poland.

History
In 1827, Skudzawy had a population of 232.

During the German occupation of Poland (World War II), local school teachers were among the victims of large massacres of Poles from the region carried out by the Germans in nearby Skrwilno as part of the Intelligenzaktion.

References

Villages in Rypin County